Aerodrome de Belladère is an airport that serves Belladère in the Centre department of Haiti. It supports only small aircraft.

Airport may be closed. Satellite imagery shows structures encroaching the eastern end of the runway. See Talk page.

See also
Transport in Haiti
List of airports in Haiti

References

External links
OpenStreetMap - Belladère
MAF charter air service

Airports in Haiti
Centre (department)